Ferg Forever is the debut mixtape by American rapper ASAP Ferg. It was released on November 28, 2014, by ASAP Worldwide. The mixtape features guest appearances from Big Sean, M.I.A., Twista, Bunji Garlin, YG, Wynter Gordon and ASAP Nast, among others.

Background 
In an interview with Complex, Ferg explained the tape's cover art as the 'Ferg' logo, which belonged to his father (Darold Ferguson), who owns a Harlem Boutique and a printed shirts and logos for record labels, such as Bad Boy Records. Ferg has always been inspired by Fashion through his father's influence, thus creating the brand, along with the title Traplord.

Critical response 

The mixtape's first single, called "Doe-Active" was released on November 17, 2014. The song received a positive reviews, with Pitchfork.com praising the track's production and A$AP Ferg's delivery:

Track listing 

Sample credits
 "Thug Cry" samples the hook, bridge and instrumental from Tinashe's song of the same name.
 "This Side" samples the instrumental from Danny Seth's "I Arise Because".
 "Reloaded (Let It Go Pt. 2)" contains a sample of "Let It Go", as heard in the Disney film Frozen (2013).
 "Uncle" contains a sample of "Pagan Poetry" performed by "Björk".

References

External links 
 
 Traplord by ASAP Ferg

2014 mixtape albums
RCA Records albums
Albums produced by Big K.R.I.T.
Albums produced by Mike Will Made It
ASAP Ferg albums